Eliseo Francisco Mendoza Berrueto (13 April 1931 – 17 May 2022) was a Mexican politician and economist. He served as the Governor of Coahuila from 1 December 1987 until 30 November 1993.

He was the President of the Chamber of Deputies in 1985.

References

1931 births
2022 deaths
Governors of Coahuila
Mexican economists
Presidents of the Chamber of Deputies (Mexico)
Deputies of the LIII Legislature of Mexico
Institutional Revolutionary Party politicians
Politicians from San Pedro, Coahuila
20th-century Mexican politicians
Grand Crosses of the Order of the Sun of Peru